Pelicanman (Finnish: Pelikaanimies) is a 2004 Finnish fantasy film.

Plot
A pelican magically changes his appearance into that of a young man. He walks and acts somewhat oddly compared to real humans, and at first he does not know much about humans, but he learns fast. He rents an apartment and gets a job. The 10-year-old boy Emil finds out that he is a pelican, and they become friends.

The pelican man is sent to a zoo, but Emil helps him escape. Then the pelican man changes back to pelican appearance.

External links

2004 films
2000s fantasy adventure films
2000s Finnish-language films
Films based on Finnish novels
Finnish fantasy adventure films